Marleston is a suburb of Adelaide, South Australia, in the City of West Torrens. Marleston was home to 1,950 people at the 2021 census.

Several years later he sold the land to John Marles, who subdivided it in 1879.

Demographics

The 2021 Census by the Australian Bureau of Statistics counted 1,950 persons in Marleston on census night. Of these, 49.0% were male and 50.8% were female.

The majority of residents (58.5%) are of Australian birth, with other common census responses being India (7.6%), China (4.4%), Nepal (2.8%), England (2.6%), and Greece (2.3%). Additionally, people of Aboriginal and/or Torres Strait Islander descent made up 1.3% of the suburb.

In terms of religious affiliation, 37.1% attributed themselves to being irreligious, 17.0% of residents attributed themselves to being Catholic, 7.1% attributed themselves to Hinduism, and 6.9% attributed themselves to being Eastern Orthodox.

References

Suburbs of Adelaide